Wen Tzu-yun (born 29 September 1993) is a Taiwanese karateka. At the 2020 Summer Olympics in Tokyo, Japan, she won one of the bronze medals in the women's 55 kg event. She is also a two-time gold medalist in the women's kumite 55 kg event at the Asian Games and a two-time bronze medalist in this event at the World Karate Championships.

Career 

She won the gold medal in the women's 55 kg event at the Asian Games both in 2014 and in 2018. 
She won one of the bronze medals in her event at the 2016 World University Karate Championships held in Braga, Portugal. She also won the silver medal in the women's team kumite event.

At the 2017 World Games held in Wrocław, Poland, she won the silver medal in the women's kumite 55 kg event. In the final, she lost against Valéria Kumizaki of Brazil.

She represented Chinese Taipei at the 2020 Summer Olympics in Tokyo, Japan in karate. She won one of the bronze medals in the women's 55 kg event. In her semifinal she lost against eventual silver medalist Anzhelika Terliuga of Ukraine. In November 2021, she competed in the women's 55 kg event at the World Karate Championships held in Dubai, United Arab Emirates.

Achievements

References

External links 

 
 

1993 births
Living people
Sportspeople from Taipei
Taiwanese female karateka
Karateka at the 2014 Asian Games
Karateka at the 2018 Asian Games
Medalists at the 2014 Asian Games
Medalists at the 2018 Asian Games
Asian Games medalists in karate
Asian Games gold medalists for Chinese Taipei
World Games silver medalists
Competitors at the 2017 World Games
World Games medalists in karate
Karateka at the 2020 Summer Olympics
Olympic medalists in karate
Medalists at the 2020 Summer Olympics
Olympic bronze medalists for Taiwan
21st-century Taiwanese women